Rising Force is the first studio album by guitarist Yngwie Malmsteen, released in late 1984 through Polydor Records. This was originally planned as an instrumental side-project of his then-current band Alcatrazz, but due to singer Jeff Scott Soto's appearance on the album, Malmsteen opted to release it as a solo album. It reached No. 14 on the Swedish albums chart and No. 60 on the US Billboard 200, and received a nomination for Best Rock Instrumental Performance at the 1986 Grammy Awards. The album is regarded as a landmark release in the shred and neoclassical metal genres.

Critical reception

Steve Huey at AllMusic gave Rising Force four stars out of five, calling it "a revelation upon its release" and "The true inauguration of the age of the guitar shredder." He praised Malmsteen's technique and "blinding virtuosity", as well as highlighting his "obsessions with Bach, Beethoven, and Paganini".

In a 2009 article by Guitar World magazine, Rising Force was ranked first in the all-time top ten list of shred albums. The staff wrote: "Yngwie J. Malmsteen was, is, and always will be the greatest shredder of all time. Hell, he invented the genre with his 1985  debut."

"Black Star" and "Far Beyond the Sun" have endured as two of Malmsteen's most popular songs, as well as being staples of his live setlist. In a 2008 Guitar World interview, Malmsteen said of the two songs: "I'll probably play 'Far Beyond the Sun' and 'Black Star' until the day I die."

Track listing

Personnel
Yngwie Malmsteen – guitar, Moog Taurus, bass, arrangement, production
Jens Johansson – keyboards, harpsichord arrangement (track 7)
Barriemore Barlow – drums
Jeff Scott Soto – vocals
Lester Claypool – engineering
Peter Vargo – engineering

Chart performance

Awards

References

External links
Rising Force at yngwiemalmsteen.com
In Review: Yngwie J. Malmsteen "Rising Force" at Guitar Nine Records

Yngwie Malmsteen albums
1984 debut albums
Polydor Records albums
Grammy Award for Best Rock Instrumental Performance